C101  may refer to:
 CASA C-101, a low-wing single engine jet-powered advanced trainer and light attack aircraft
 C-101, a supersonic anti-ship missile that can be launched from air, ship and shore
 Centrair C101 Pegase
 C-101 Vega